Maria Tschetschulin (1852–1917), was a Finnish clerk. She was the first woman to attend university in Finland.

Maria Tschetschulin, who was of Russian descent through her Russian father, was the daughter of the steam boat owner Feodor Tschetschulin and Hilda Eckstein in Helsinki. After the death of her father and the bankruptcy of her family, she applied for a permission to study to support her family, having three younger sisters. In 1870, she became the first female university student in Finland at the University of Helsinki. Women were not allowed to study there, but she was given special dispensation to do so, and thus became the first woman in the Nordic countries to do so: though women in Sweden was given the right to attend university the same year, the first woman, Betty Pettersson, did not enlist at university until the year after. Maria Tschetschulin was the first female to study at university, but she discontinued her studies in 1873 without taking her exam, and the first female graduate was Emma Irene Åström in 1882; she described herself as an anti-feminist, and did not wish to attend lectures in the company of only men. After her studies, she successfully worked within the steam boat business of her family.

She was sister of the violinist, composer and music teacher Agnes Tschetschulin.

References

 kansallisbiografia Suomen kansallisbiografia  (National Biography of Finland)

1852 births
1917 deaths
People from Helsinki
People from Uusimaa Province (Grand Duchy of Finland)
Finnish people of Russian descent
19th-century Finnish women